Carles Castillejo Salvador (born August 18, 1978 in Barcelona) is a Spanish long distance runner. He has won Spanish national titles in the 5000 m, the 10,000 m and the marathon. He has represented Spain at the Olympics on four occasions (2004, 2008,  2012 and 2016).

Biography
He made his first international appearances for Spain in 2004. He ran in the long race at the 2004 IAAF World Cross Country Championships and finished in 57th place. He had greater success on the track: he won the national title over 5000 metres and was a close second to Hudson de Souza over 3000 metres at the 2004 Ibero-American Championships in Athletics. His Olympic debut followed at the 2004 Athens Olympics, but he was eliminated in the heats of the 5000 m.

In 2005, he improved to 26th place in the World Cross Country long race. He also ran a 10,000 metres personal best of 28:06.88 minutes to take second place at the European Cup 10000m. The following year he ranked 29th at the World Cross Country and helped Spain to the team silver medals at the 2006 European Cross Country Championships with a tenth-place finish. He continued to perform well at the European Cup 10000m, taking the bronze in 2007 and silver in 2008. After running a personal best of 27:39.79 minutes in Vigo, he ran in the event at the 2008 Beijing Olympics and managed 23rd place overall. He had a career best finish of 26th at the 2009 IAAF World Cross Country Championships, then went on to claim the silver medal over 5000 m at the 2009 European Team Championships. His best performance on the world stage followed, as he came 15th in the 10,000 m at the 2009 World Championships in Athletics.

The highlight of his 2010 season was a fifth-place finish in the 10,000 m at the European Championships. Castillejo made his debut over the marathon distance in 2011 at the national championship race held at the Maratón Ciudad de Castellón. He won the race with a time of 2:10:02 hours – a performance which guaranteed him selection for the 2012 Summer Olympics. He defeated Patrick Makau (the marathon world record holder) at the 2012 Granollers Half Marathon in February, where he performed well in near-freezing conditions.  At the 2012 Summer Olympics, he finished in 24th place.

In Río Olympics 2016 he finished 49th with a time of 2h18m34s, his last marathon as a professional.

Achievements

References

External links

1978 births
Living people
Spanish male long-distance runners
Spanish male marathon runners
Athletes (track and field) at the 2004 Summer Olympics
Athletes (track and field) at the 2008 Summer Olympics
Athletes (track and field) at the 2012 Summer Olympics
Olympic athletes of Spain
Athletes from Barcelona
World Athletics Championships athletes for Spain
Mediterranean Games silver medalists for Spain
Mediterranean Games medalists in athletics
Athletes (track and field) at the 2005 Mediterranean Games
Competitors at the 2003 Summer Universiade
Competitors at the 2005 Summer Universiade